was a statesman, politician, judge, prosecutor, educator and cabinet minister in Taishō and early Shōwa period Japan.

Early life and education
Suzuki was born Kawashima Kisaburō in what is now part of the city of Kawasaki, Kanagawa. A younger son, he was adopted at an early age by Suzuki Jiko, a Buddhist prelate in Kawasaki, and received the Suzuki surname.

He was a graduate of the law school of Tokyo Imperial University in 1891.

Career
Suzuki entered the Ministry of Justice in 1891 as a judge. In 1893, he became a judge at the Tokyo District Court then its Chief Judge in 1907 and subsequently was promoted to the Tokyo Court of Appeals, and finally to the Supreme Court of Judicature of Japan, where he was noted for his quick judgments. He then served as Chief of the Criminal Affairs Bureau of the Justice Ministry, Vice Justice Minister, and  ) in 1921.

Suzuki’s political career began in 1920, when he was appointed to the House of Peers. In 1924, he was selected as Justice Minister in the cabinet of Kiyoura Keigo. During this period, he lent aid to and was "very active" in the Kokuhonsha, a nationalist organization founded by Kiichirō Hiranuma "to combat the spread of liberal and foreign ideas". Following the collapse of the Kiyoura administration in 1926, Suzuki joined the Rikken Seiyūkai. The following year, he joined the administration of Tanaka Giichi as Home Minister. While Home Minister, he strengthened the Tokubetsu Kōtō Keisatsu and enforcement of the stricter Peace Preservation Laws, and took an uncompromisingly harsh position against activities by the outlawed Japan Communist Party, culminating in the March 15 incident which involved the arrest of hundreds of known party members and suspected party sympathizers. He also used his position as Home Minister to replace 17 prefectural governors with Rikken Seiyūkai members, as well as showing favoritism to promotions within the Ministry itself towards party members. These actions led to his forced resignation in 1928 after charges were made this constituted illegal interference with the 1928 General Election.

Suzuki returned to the Diet of Japan in the 1932 General Election, when he was elected to the House of Representatives from the Kanagawa 2nd district. He returned to the cabinet as Justice Minister from 1931-1932 and as Home Minister from 1932-1933 under the Inukai administration. On Inukai’s assassination in the May 15 incident, Suzuki became president of the Rikken Seiyūkai. However, despite holding a majority of the seats in the Diet of Japan, Suzuki was not selected to become Prime Minister, largely due to a long-standing enmity with the last genrō Saionji Kinmochi, who favored Admiral Saitō Makoto for the post. After Saitō’s resignation in 1934, Suzuki was again sidelined, and the office of Prime Minister went to Okada Keisuke.

Following losses in the 1936 General Election, Suzuki no longer had a seat in the Diet. Pressured to resign as head of the Rikken Seiyūkai, he held onto the post until 1937 as part of a collective leadership.

Additionally, Suzuki taught criminal law at Waseda University.

Personal life and demise
Suzuki was married to Kazuka Hatoyama, daughter of Kazuo Hatoyama,  head of the political Hatoyama family.

Suzuki died in 1940, and his grave is at the Yanaka Cemetery in Tokyo.

References

External links

National Diet Library biography

Notes

 

1867 births
1940 deaths
University of Tokyo alumni
Members of the House of Peers (Japan)
Rikken Seiyūkai politicians
Government ministers of Japan
Ministers of Home Affairs of Japan
Members of the House of Representatives (Empire of Japan)
Prosecutors General of Japan